The Old Patagonian Express (1979) is a written account of a journey taken by novelist Paul Theroux. Starting out from his home town in Massachusetts, via Boston and Chicago, Theroux travels by train across the North American plains to Laredo, Texas. He then crosses the border and takes a train south through Mexico to Veracruz where he meets a woman looking for her long-lost lover. He then takes the train south into Guatemala and then El Salvador where he goes to a soccer match and is amazed by the violence. He then flies to Costa Rica where he takes the train to Limón and Puntarenas. He ended his transit of Central America in Panama where he takes the short train ride across the isthmus. Theroux then proceeds to Colombia and then over the Andes and finally reaches the small town of Esquel in Patagonia. He endures harsh climates, including the extreme altitude of Peru and the Bolivian Plateau, meets the author Jorge Luis Borges in Buenos Aires and is reunited with long lost family in Ecuador.

The book has been praised for its depth and understanding about the people, the culture, giving a flavor of the various South American countries.

See also
The Old Patagonian Express

References

American travel books
History of Patagonia
1979 non-fiction books
Books about Argentina
Books about Latin America
Books by Paul Theroux
Houghton Mifflin books